My Home Is Copacabana is a 1965 Swedish drama film directed by Arne Sucksdorff. It was entered into the 1965 Cannes Film Festival and the 4th Moscow International Film Festival. Sucksdorff won the award for Best Director at the 2nd Guldbagge Awards.

In 2019, Toninho's daughter Anna de Lima Fagerlind published a book titled "My Home is Not Copacabana" about her father's experience in connection with the filming. According to the book, Toninho was nine years old when Sucksdorff came to Rio and picked him to star in the movie. Toninho was presented as an orphan street child, which was not true as he had a mother and siblings and lived in a favela house overlooking Ipanema beach, and flown to Sweden to promote the movie. While in Sweden, a wealthy family offered to adopt Toninho, and his mother reluctantly agreed having seen his brother slide into criminality.

Cast
 Leila Santos de Sousa - Lici (as Leila)
 Cosme dos Santos - Jorginho (as Cosme)
 Josafá Da Silva Santos - Paulinho (as Josafá)
 Toninho Carlos de Lima - Rico (as Toninho)
 Herminia Gonçalves
 Dirce Migliaccio
 João Lucas
 Flávio Migliaccio
 Alvaro Peres
 Andrey Salvador
 Antonio Pitanga
 Joel Barcellos
 Alberto Carvalho
 Walter Lira
 Benedito de Assis
 Anael Pereira
 Allan Edwall - Narrator (voice)

References

External links

1965 films
1965 drama films
Swedish drama films
1960s Swedish-language films
Swedish black-and-white films
Films directed by Arne Sucksdorff
Films whose director won the Best Director Guldbagge Award
1960s Swedish films